Turatia iranica is a moth in the family Autostichidae. It was described by László Anthony Gozmány in 2000. It is found in Oman, the United Arab Emirates and Iran.

References

Moths described in 2000
Turatia